Traditional Techniques is a solo album by American musician Stephen Malkmus, the fourth album credited to Malkmus and the second to not feature his band The Jicks. It is the ninth project in Malkmus's career since Pavement disbanded, and the fourteenth album released in his career. It was released on March 6, 2020 by Matador Records and Domino Recording Company.

Background and recording

Malkmus conceived the idea for Traditional Techniques during the recording of Sparkle Hard. According to a press release, the concept gained traction and became a fully realized album in a matter of weeks. Recording of the album took place in Portland, Oregon, at Halfling Studio. The album was produced by Chris Funk of The Decemberists and features guitarist Matt Sweeney and musician Qais Essar.

Critical reception

Traditional Techniques received positive reviews from music critics. Many critics praised Malkmus' foray into folk music. At Metacritic, which assigns a normalized rating out of 100 to reviews from mainstream publications, the album received an average score of 80, based on eighteen reviews, indicating "generally favorable" reviews.

Writing for Loud and Quiet, Sam Walton gave the album a positive review, praising it as "an expertly written and performed exploration of muted psych-rock and various strands of folk music".

Robert Christgau gave the album a two-star honorable mention in his Substack-published "Consumer Guide" column, highlighting the songs "Xian Man" and "Cash Up" while writing in summation: "It’s more than cool, as it had better be, that he’s matured from willfully acerbic to willingly pretty, but he’s too smart not to know in the heart he’s proud to have that while acerbic feeds on chaos, pretty is better off explaining itself".

Track listing

Credits

Adapted from Allmusic:

Stephen Malkmus – composer, lead vocals, guitar, bass
Chris Funk – autoharp, dobro, Moog synthesizer, pedal steel, weissenborn, producer
Blake Mills – guitar
Bill Athens – bass
Qais Essar – rabab
Eric Zang – daf, kaval, udu
Matt Sweeney – electric guitar, acoustic guitar, vocals
Spooner Oldham – wurlitzer
Joy Pearson – vocals
Dan Hunt – drums, percussion

Additional credits

Sharmila Banerjee – illustrations
Jan Lankisch – design
Adam Lee – mixing
Jeff Lipton – mastering
Maria Rice – mastering
Jason Quigley – photography

References 

2020 albums
Stephen Malkmus albums
Matador Records albums
Domino Recording Company albums